Antonio Calle (born 14 October 1978), known as Calle, is a Spanish former footballer who played as a striker, currently a manager.

He amassed Segunda División totals of 258 matches and 70 goals over ten seasons, representing in the competition Xerez, Recreativo, Albacete, Gimnàstic, Girona and Valladolid. He played in La Liga with the second club, in 2006–07.

Playing career
Calle was born in Madrid. Having spent his early years playing mostly in the area, including stints with Rayo Vallecano and Atlético Madrid's reserve teams, he joined Segunda División side Xerez CD in January 2002, where his impressive scoring rate attracted the attention of neighbours Recreativo de Huelva, which signed him for the 2004–05 season.

After having scored twice in La Liga in his first top-division experience (both in a 3–2 away win against Real Sociedad on 24 September 2006), Calle was deemed surplus to requirements and finished the campaign in division two with Albacete Balompié, having another good individual record. In 2007–08 he played with Gimnàstic de Tarragona, returning the following season to Xerez on loan and contributing eight goals in 1,523 minutes as the Andalusians achieved a first-ever promotion to the top flight.

After the 2009 August transfer window had already closed, Calle moved to Girona FC also of the second tier. Thus, he had to wait until January of the following year to appear officially for his new team.

Calle stayed in the second division for the 2010–11 campaign, with the 31-year-old signing for Real Valladolid in the summer and joining former club Albacete in January 2011. He subsequently represented UD Socuéllamos and CP Villarrobledo, and announced his retirement on 21 June 2017.

Coaching career
Calle began working as a manager in early 2019, going on to be in charge of Xerez in Tercera División and Atlético Onubense in the Andalusian regional leagues.

References

External links
Stats at Liga de Fútbol Profesional 

1978 births
Living people
Footballers from Madrid
Spanish footballers
Association football forwards
La Liga players
Segunda División players
Segunda División B players
Tercera División players
Rayo Vallecano B players
Talavera CF players
Atlético Madrid C players
Xerez CD footballers
Recreativo de Huelva players
Albacete Balompié players
Gimnàstic de Tarragona footballers
Girona FC players
Real Valladolid players
UD Socuéllamos players
Spanish football managers
Segunda División B managers
Tercera División managers
Xerez CD managers
Recreativo de Huelva managers